Cândido Rubens Padín, OSB, (September 5
, 1915 – January 25, 2008) was a Brazilian bishop of the Roman Catholic Church.

Padín was born in  São Carlos, Brazil, and was ordained a priest on July 15, 1946, from the religious order of Order of Saint Benedict. Padín was appointed Auxiliary bishop of the Archdiocese of São Sebastião do Rio de Janeiro as well as Titular Bishop Tremithus, and was ordained a bishop on August 5, 1962. On January 5, 1966, Padín was appointed bishop of the Diocese of Lorena. His last appointment came on April 27, 1970, to the Diocese of Bauru from which he would retire on September 4, 1990.

Padín died on January 25, 2008, at age of 92.

See also
Order of Saint Benedict
Archdiocese of São Sebastião do Rio de Janeiro
Diocese of Bauru
Diocese of Lorena

External links
Hierarchy
São Sebastião do Rio de Janeiro Site

1915 births
2008 deaths
Participants in the Second Vatican Council
20th-century Roman Catholic bishops in Brazil
Brazilian Benedictines
Roman Catholic bishops of São Sebastião do Rio de Janeiro
Roman Catholic bishops of Bauru
Roman Catholic bishops of Lorena